Klinti Qato (born 23 December 1997) is an Albanian footballer who plays as a midfielder for Laçi in the Kategoria Superiore.

Career

Luftëtari
In August 2019, Qato joined Luftëtari in the Albanian Superliga. He made his league debut for the club on 24 August 2019 in a 3–0 away defeat to KF Tirana.

Tomori
In the summer 2020 he joined KF Tomori on a free transfer.Qato scored he's first professional goal against KF Lushnja on February 27, 2021.

References

External links

1997 births
Living people
KF Teuta Durrës players
Luftëtari Gjirokastër players
Kategoria Superiore players
Albanian footballers
Association football midfielders